Veal Prince Orloff, veal Prince Orlov, veal Orloff, or veal Orlov (or veau Orlov) is a 19th-century dish of Russian cuisine, which purportedly was created by the French chef Urbain Dubois in the employ of Prince Orloff, former Russian ambassador to France. The dish consists of a braised loin of veal, thinly sliced, filled with a thin layer of finely chopped mushrooms  (duxelles) and onions (as soubise) between the slices, then reassembled in the original shape. It is then topped with Mornay sauce (bechamel sauce with cheese) and browned in the oven.

Similar dishes are popular in Russia today where they usually go by the name French-style meat. In these varieties, veal is often replaced by cheaper sorts of meat, such as beef or pork, and the Mornay sauce may be replaced by mayonnaise. A layer of sliced potatoes is also often added.

See also
 List of casserole dishes
 List of mushroom dishes
 List of Russian dishes
 List of veal dishes

References

Russian cuisine
Veal dishes
Casserole dishes
Mushroom dishes